Toivo Johannes Paloposki (3 April 1928 in Terijoki – 24 January 1991 in Kirkkonummi) was a Finnish archivist and historian.

Paloposki focused on Finland's 18th-century history and treated also economic-historical issues. Amongst his works are Suomen historian lähteet (1972), which is a basic work on sources of Finland's history, and some local historical works. He was director of the National Archives of Finland in 1974–1987.

References 
 Paloposki, Toivo in Uppslagsverket Finland.

1928 births
1991 deaths
People from Zelenogorsk, Saint Petersburg
20th-century Finnish historians
Finnish archivists